Võ Bình Định (Chữ Hán: 武平定) (short for võ thuật Bình Định 武術平定, martial arts of Bình Định Province) is a regional form of martial arts in Vietnam.

Any martial art developed in Tỉnh (state or province) Binh Dinh is called Võ Bình Định. There are 11 huyện (counties or districts) in the Binh Dinh Region that practice martial arts. These include villages and cities within each country that contain styles ranging anywhere from 100 to 600 years old.

History
Binh Dinh is the Capital of Martial Arts in Vietnam as Foshan is the Capital of Martial Arts in China. There are over 100 different fighting systems in Binh Dinh province, some which are very different to one another. As a general term, any martial arts developed in Binh Dinh province is just called Vo Binh Dinh. There are many traditional and non-traditional styles in Binh Dinh province. The term Vo Co Truyen translates to traditional Vietnamese martial arts. Traditional Vietnamese martial arts according to Vietnamese martial arts scholar and president of the Federation of Traditional Vietnamese Martial Arts Federation (Liên đoàn Võ thuật Cổ truyền Việt Nam) PhD Phạm Đình Phong was developed thousands of years ago by farmers (Người nông dân) along the Mekong Delta. These people considered themselves Viet and defined themselves as genetically different from the Chinese who considered themselves as Han. The Viet people developed their fighting system and style by mimicking animals in the jungle such as tigers, monkeys, and snakes. According to Phạm Đình Phong's research traditional Vietnamese martial arts in was mainly developed to defend against larger neighboring countries. There are many martial art's systems in Binh Dinh province that are traditional Vietnamese martial arts and some that are not considered traditional Vietnamese martial arts. One particular style of traditional Vietnamese martial arts in Binh Dinh province that is popular is called Vo Tay Son. Vo Tay Son's popularity came about during times of feudalism (thời phong kiến). There were three brothers known as the Tay Son brothers because they were from a county in the state of Binh Dinh called Tay Son. Their names were Nguyen Nhac, Nguyen Lu, and Nguyen Hue. The three Tay Son brothers overthrew the Nguyen lords and Trinh lords and united Vietnam into the shape of the letter S as seen today.  Today the martial arts that was practiced by the Tay Son Brothers is called Vo Tay Son. Any system that has techniques and forms used by the Tay Son Brothers is called Vo Tay Son.

An Vinh Village
An Vinh Village is located in the county of Tay Son and is considered Vo Co Truyen Vietnam and also Vo Ta which translates to Our Martial Arts. The founder of the An Vinh Village Style of võ Bình Định is Nguyễn Ngạc. According to the villagers of An Vinh, Nguyễn Ngạc is a descendant of Bùi Thị Xuân a talented martial artist and famous general during the Tây Sơn rebellion.
Vietnamese people are typically smaller in stature and the An Vinh style assumes that the opponent is not Vietnamese, making them possibly taller and stronger. With a height and strength advantage, An Vinh Style utilizes speed to overwhelm their opponents with by combining multiple strikes and combinations in a single attack which can be seen in their empty hand forms.

An Thai Village
An Thai is a neighboring Village to An Vinh located in An Nhon County across a river known as The Con River and is the birthplace of Tay Son Martial Arts as the Tay Son Brothers first Master Truong Van Hien opened his martial arts school in this village around 1765 in order to escape persecution.

Over time the village of An Thai became home to many ethnic Chinese, some from Phu Kien, Tieu Chew, Hai Nan, and Guang dong and those practicing Tay Son Martial Arts  over time moved out of the village. The founder of the An Thai Village Style of võ Bình Định is Diệp Trường Phát. Born in 1896 in An Thai village Binh Dinh province with his ethnic origins being Chinese as his parents are from Ming Xiang, China. At the age of thirteen Diệp Trường Phát was sent to China to study martial arts which he later brought back to the An Thai Village after many years of intensive training. After returning home to An Thai Village from his training Grand Master Diep Truong Phat continued to practice and develop his own style of martial arts. Grand Master Diệp Trường Phát's goal was to develop a style from scratch in order to teach those in the An Thai Village as that village did not have their own martial arts. There are many in Binh Dinh Province who consider An Thai as Vo Tau or Chinese martial arts however Nguyen An Pha a board member of the Federation of Vietnamese Martial arts explained that since this style was developed in Binh Dinh Province it is considered as Vo Binh Dinh Martial Arts and is also Vietnamese Martial Arts and is no longer Chinese Martial Arts. An Thai fighting system focuses on power and strength as every strike utilizes one hit as one kill.

Schools
Famous schools in the Bình Định region include the following: Võ đường Phan Thọ, Võ đường Phi Long Vịnh, Võ Đường Chùa Long Phước,  Bình Thái Đạo  Võ đường Lý Xuân Hỷ  Võ đường Lê Xuân Cảnh  and Võ đường Hồ Gia.

References

Vietnamese martial arts